Anthony "Spice" Adams (born June 18, 1980) is an American television host, actor, comedian, and former football defensive tackle. After playing college football for Penn State, he was drafted by the San Francisco 49ers in the second round of the 2003 NFL Draft, for whom he played four seasons, followed by the Chicago Bears from 2007 to 2011.

After his playing career, he became involved in social media and television. He is a former co-host of The Great American Baking Show, the American adaptation of the popular Great British Bake Off.Starred in the Great American baking show.

College career
Adams played for the Penn State Nittany Lions football team from 1999 to 2002, being named to the academic all-Big Ten Conference team in the former and honorable mention all-Big Ten in the latter.

During his freshman year, he recorded four tackles in nine games, which increased to 36 tackles and a sack the following season. As a junior, he had 59 tackles, 3.5 sacks, and led the team in tackles-for-loss with 11. In his senior year, he had 67 tackles, two sacks, 13 tackles-for-loss, and four pass breakups. The 2002 Nittany Lions entered the 2003 Capital One Bowl with the chance to record their first top-ten ranking since 1996, but lost to Auburn.

Adams graduated with a business degree in 2003.

Professional career

Before the 2003 NFL Draft, Adams participated in the Senior Bowl. Representing the North alongside four of his Penn State teammates, his team won 17–0.

The San Francisco 49ers selected Adams in the second round (57th overall) of the 2003 NFL Draft; the 49ers, who lost two starting defensive linemen during the offseason, drafted Adams and defensive end Andrew Williams in the following round to fill the gap.

Adams became a free agent after the 2006 season, ending his 49ers tenure with 155 tackles and six sacks in 58 games. On March 25, 2007, he signed a four-year contract with the Chicago Bears; team writer Larry Mayer described Adams as "an undersized but quick tackle who seemingly is an ideal fit for the Bears' one-gap defense." In 2010, he started all 16 games and the Bears' playoff games; at season's end, he was named a Brian Piccolo Award recipient. The following season, he only started four games and appeared in 11, and was released on February 26, 2012.

He announced his retirement via YouTube on March 24, 2013. In nine seasons, he served primarily as a depth player, starting at least eight games in three years. He ended his career with 278 tackles and 10.5 sacks.

Personal life
Adams and his wife, Andenika, have four children. Teammates have bestowed several nicknames on Adams: Former 49ers teammate Bryant Young dubbed him "Double A" not only for his initials but also for his suspicion that Adams' extra energy came from batteries. His Penn State teammates nicknamed him "Spice". Adams was voted "Mama's Boy" his senior year at Martin Luther King High School in Detroit. He is a member of Omega Psi Phi fraternity and was initiated at Nu Chapter. In the summer of 2012, Adams produced a series of videos on YouTube about life as an NFL free agent.  On May 5, 2013, Adams earned his Masters in Business Administration from George Washington University.

Community involvement
Since 2006, Adams has been involved with Youthville, a program in his hometown of Detroit. He gave away two Super Bowl XL tickets to the student who demonstrated the greatest improvement in grade point average. In 2009, Adams visited several Chicago Public Schools to help students write letters to troops overseas during the Iraq and Afghanistan wars.

Media career
During his tenure with the 49ers, Adams was a blogger and hosted an online show with teammate Mike Adams called The Adams Report.

Starting on September 14, 2013, Adams began hosting a weekly half-hour show titled Inside the Bears, which airs on WFLD and WPWR-TV.

In 2016, Adams began a recurring role on the HBO series Ballers. He was announced on September 21, 2017 as one of the new hosts of The Great American Baking Show, an American adaptation of The Great British Bake Off, on ABC.

Adams is well known for his Instagram account, where he posts comedic videos under the username "spiceadams". Many of the characters and skits he has created have gone viral since 2018; an example is his catchphrase "ahaha", which became the subject of multiple memes on Twitter, and a photo of him hiding behind a tree in a bright yellow suit while rubbing his hands together and licking his lips in an expression of desire for what he is looking at.

References

External links

Chicago Bears bio

1980 births
Living people
African-American players of American football
American football defensive tackles
Chicago Bears players
Penn State Nittany Lions football players
Players of American football from Detroit
San Francisco 49ers players
American television hosts
21st-century African-American sportspeople
20th-century African-American people
Ed Block Courage Award recipients
Brian Piccolo Award winners